Claire Louise Bowern is a linguist who works with Australian Indigenous languages. She is currently a professor of linguistics at Yale University, and has a secondary appointment in the department of anthropology at Yale.

Career 
Bowern received her PhD from Harvard University in 2004, under the advisement of Jay Jasanoff and Calvert Watkins. Her dissertation was about Bardi, a Nyulnyulan language, and its verbal morphology, both diachronically and synchronically. In 2007, the NSF/NEH awarded her a grant to study Bardi texts from the 1920s. The thesis also included a sketch grammar of Bardi, as well as the first attempted reconstruction of Proto-Nyulnyulan.

She is the author of two widely used linguistics textbooks, Linguistic Fieldwork: A Practical Guide and An Introduction to Historical Linguistics.

Chirila 

At Yale, Bowern founded the Contemporary and Historical Reconstruction in the Indigenous Languages of Australia database (Chirila), through the Yale Pama-Nyungan Lab. The name for the database was inspired by both the motivations of the project and the word for "echidna" in many Western Desert languages, tyirilya. Bowern's interest in the historical linguistics of Australian languages has directed the lab to collect lexical data for a more thorough accounting of the composition of the Pama-Nyungan language family.

Service 
Since 2015 she has been the vice president of the Endangered Language Fund.

 Bowern is on the editorial review board for the following publications:

 Language Dynamics and Change (editorial board)
 Diachronica (executive editor)
 Transactions of the Philological Society (editorial board)
 Routledge Studies in Historical Linguistics (series editor)
 EL Publishing (advisory board)
 Conceptual Foundations of Language Science (editorial board)

Bowern was previously an associate editor of Language, specifically responsible for the historical linguistics and language documentation areas from 2012 to 2016.

Awards and honors 

The Kenneth L. Hale Award was awarded to her in 2014, for her documentation work on Bardi.

In 2020, Bowern was inducted as a Fellow of the Linguistic Society of America.

Key publications 
 (2014) Bowern, Claire and Bethwyn Evans (eds). Routledge Handbook of Historical Linguistics. Basingstoke: Routledge.
 (2012) Bowern, Claire. A Grammar of Bardi. Mouton de Gruyter.
 (2011) Bowern, Claire. Sivisa Titan: Sketch Grammar, Texts, Vocabulary Based on Material Collected by P. Josef Meier and Po Minis. University of Hawaii Press.
 (2010) Bowern, Claire and Terry Crowley. An Introduction to Historical Linguistics. Oxford/New York: Oxford University Press. Fourth edition.
 (2008) Bowern, Claire. Linguistic Fieldwork: A practical guide. Palgrave. (Online Materials)  (2nd Edition 2015)
 (2004) Bowern, Claire and Harold Koch (eds). Australian Languages: Classification and the Comparative Method. Benjamins

References

External links 
 Yale faculty profile
 The Conversation profile
 Academia.edu profile
 LSA Member spotlight
 CHIRILA: A database of the languages of Australia (Contemporary and Historical Reconstruction in the Indigenous Languages of Australia)
 CHIRILA, Yale Pama-Nyungan Lab
 

Living people
Linguists from Australia
Women linguists
Historical linguists
Harvard University alumni
Yale University faculty
Linguists of Australian Aboriginal languages
Linguists of Tasmanian languages
Computational linguistics researchers
21st-century linguists
Year of birth missing (living people)
Fellows of the Linguistic Society of America